Virginia Ruano Pascual and Paola Suárez were the defending champions, but chose not to participate that year.

Květa Peschke and Rennae Stubbs won in the final 6–0, 6–1, against Alicia Molik and Mara Santangelo.

Seeds

Draw

External links
Draw

LA Women's Tennis Championships
East West Bank Classic
East West Bank Classic - Doubles